Title 12 of the United States Code outlines the role of Banks and Banking in the United States Code.

 : The Comptroller of the Currency
 : National Banks
 : Federal Reserve System
 : Taxation
 : Crimes And Offenses
 : Foreign Banking
 : Export-Import Bank of the United States
 : Farm Credit Administration
 : Agricultural Marketing
 : Regional Agricultural Credit Corporations
 : Adjustment and Cancellation of Farm Loans
 : National Agricultural Credit Corporations
 : Local Agricultural-Credit Corporations, Livestock-Loan Companies and Like Organizations; Loans to Individuals to Aid in Formation or to Increase Capital Stock
 : Federal Home Loan Banks
 : Federal Home Loan Mortgage Corporation
 : Savings Associations
 : National Housing
 : Federal Credit Unions
 : Federal Loan Agency
 : Federal Deposit Insurance Corporation
 : Bank Holding Companies
 : Bank Service Companies
 : Security Measures for Banks and Savings Associations
 : Credit Control
 : Financial Recordkeeping
 : Tying Arrangements
 : Farm Credit System
 : Federal Financing Bank
 : National Commission on Electronic Fund Transfers
 : Disposition of Abandoned Money Orders and Traveler's Checks
 : Real Estate Settlement Procedures
 : Emergency Mortgage Relief
 : Home Mortgage Disclosure
 : Community Reinvestment
 : National Consumer Cooperative Bank
 : Foreign Bank Participation in Domestic Markets
 : Depository institution Management Interlocks
 : Federal Financial Institutions Examination Council
 : Appraisal Subcommittee of Federal Financial Institutions Examination Council
 : Right to Financial Privacy
 : Depository Institutions Deregulation and Financial Regulation Simplification
 : Solar Energy and Energy Conservation Bank
 : Multifamily Mortgage Foreclosure
 : Single Family Mortgage Foreclosure
 : Alternative Mortgage Transactions2
 : International Lending Supervision
 : Expedited Funds Availability
 : Low-Income Housing Preservation and Resident Homeownership
 : Actions Against Persons Committing Bank Fraud Crimes
 : Truth in Savings
 : Payment System Risk Reduction
 : Government Sponsored Enterprises
 : Community Development Banking
 : Financial Institutions Regulatory Improvement
 : Homeowners Protection

References

External links
U.S. Code Title 12, via United States Government Printing Office
U.S. Code Title 12, via Cornell University

Title 12
12